Pandit Manas Chakraborty (Bengali: মানস চক্রবর্তী Maanosh Chokrobortee) (9 September 1942 – 12 December 2012) was an Indian classical vocalist. He was taught music by his father Tarapada Chakraborty. Chakraborty performed at many music conferences and programs including the Allauddin Music Conference (1976), the 5th RIMPA Music Festival (Benaras, 1984), and the Sawai Gandharva Sangeet Mahotsav (Pune, 1984). He was a writer and composer, and used the pseudonym Sadasant or Sadasant Piya for composing bandishes.  He composed many Bengali songs. He wrote a book with Bengali poems named "Tumio Bhetore Neel Nakhastra" edited by Maitrayee Bandyopadhyay and published by Pratibhas Publication.

Awards
 Heritage Samman by Heritage World Society, Tower Group (2012)
 Sangeet Samman Award, Presented by The Dover Lane Music Conference (2011)
 Dishari Award (Twice) – West Bengal Journalists' Association
 Maharishi Award (1987) – Maharishi World Centre of Gandharva Veda at U.K. Roydon Hall
 Girija Shankar Memorial Award (1989) – Girija Shankar Smriti Parishad
 Jadubhatta Award (1995) – Salt Lake Cultural Association, Kolkata
 Outstanding Citizen Award (2000) – English Teaching Union.
 Award for his excellence at 15th Master Dinanath Mangeshkar Sangeet Sammellan – Samrat Sangeet Academy (Goa).
 Felicitated by Rotary International
 Felicitated by Dover Lane Music Conference (1992) on his 50th birth-anniversary
 Felicitated by Kotalipara Sammelani (2000)
 Felicitated by Samatat for his contribution in the field of Indian Arts and Music
 Lifetime Achievement Award from Mohanananda Brahmachari Sishu Seva Pratisthan

References

External links
 ManasChakraborty.com

Indian male classical musicians
Bengali musicians
Thumri
Hindustani singers
1942 births
2012 deaths
20th-century Indian musicians
20th-century Indian male singers
20th-century Indian singers
Musicians from West Bengal